The Hütter H28, also called the Hutter 28, is a German mid-wing, single seat, glider that was designed by brothers Ulrich Hütter and Wolfgang Hütter in the 1930s.

Design and development
The Hütter brothers designed the H28 as a companion aircraft to the Hütter Hü 17, intending students to fly the H28 once basic skills had been mastered on the Hü 17. The design was made available as plans for amateur construction and about seven were completed. The aircraft was designed with small overall dimensions and in particular wingspan, so that it could be easily built in small workshops.

The aircraft is of wooden construction and finished with doped aircraft fabric covering. The  span wing employs a modified Göppingen 535 airfoil, with some gliders fitted with symmetrical wing tip cap. The prototype had a straight wing, but the plans were altered to provide a gull wing.

Soaring Magazine said of the design, "It was pleasing of line, especially for a small ship, with a carefully shaped root junction and one of the first molded plexiglass canopies. It is possible to discern the lines of its distinguished descendant, the Libelle, in its shape."

Operational history
An H28 was flown by Harold Jenson for Denmark in one World Gliding Championships. In 1983 one Hü 28 was reported as being registered in the United States.

Specifications (H28)

See also

References

1930s German sailplanes
Hütter aircraft
Glider aircraft
Gull-wing aircraft